Ivan Alekseevich Kuratov (Komi: Куратов Ӧльӧш Вань, Kuratov Öl’ös Van’,  in Kibra village, current Kuratovo village, Komi Republic —  in Verny, current Almaty) was a Komi poet and linguist, seen as renovator of Komi literature.

Kuratov began writing verses at age 13, while studying in a seminary, and was engaged in poetry until his death. The most fruitful period of his life were the years spent in the town of Ust-Sysolsk, where Kuratov settled after unsuccessful attempt to continue his education in Moscow. Here he taught country children, worked on linguistics and wrote poetry. During his lifetime Ivan Kuratov published only five poems, under a pseudonym.

He is the subject of Serge Noskov's 2009 opera Kuratov, the first in the Komi language.

1839 births
1875 deaths
Russian male poets
Komi people
19th-century poets
19th-century male writers from the Russian Empire